The sixth season of the American mystery drama television series Pretty Little Liars, based on the books of the same name by Sara Shepard, was renewed on June 10, 2014 for two additional seasons, making the show ABC Family's longest running original series.

The sixth and seventh seasons will consist of 20 episodes each. It aired 10 episodes for the first half the season, which began airing on June 2, 2015. Filming for the sixth season began on March 24, 2015, which was confirmed by showrunner I. Marlene King on Twitter. The season premiere was written by I. Marlene King and Lijah J. Barasz and was directed by Chad Lowe. The title of the premiere, "Game On, Charles", was revealed by King after the fifth-season finale. It was previously said that the sixth season will not include a special holiday-themed episode between the first and second half of the season, which aired on January 12, 2016, however on October 9, 2015 at New York Comic Con it was announced that there would be a behind-the-scenes special. Previous holiday-themed episodes have been the thirteenth episode of each previous season excluding the first season.

ABC Family promoted the sixth season by creating an online contest in which fans of the show could be a part of the marketing campaign to promote the show by sending in their art for consideration. The promotional poster was released on May 21, 2015 which was included in the June/July cover of Seventeen. For the second part of the season, ABC Family released a promotional poster on December 15, 2015, with the new-launched name for the network, "Freeform".

Overview 

After trying to escape the dollhouse in the season five finale, Charles punishes Emily, Hanna, Spencer, Aria, and Mona, subjecting them to various types of torture while Alison, Ezra, Caleb, and Toby try to find a way to help find the girls. Andrew becomes a suspect after being reported missing. Realizing what Charles is planning to do with Alison, the Liars hatch a plan to get out of the dollhouse by setting his vault on fire. The plan worked successfully, and the girls get out of the dollhouse where they are met by Alison, Ezra, Caleb, Toby, and the police. Andrew is arrested and accused of kidnapping the girls. However, the girls are far from okay, as they all suffer from PTSD from their time in captivity. Another girl, Sara Harvey, who went missing the same time Ali did, is found in the dollhouse, reportedly having been held there for two years. Unable to deal with her home life, she runs away and stays with Emily for a while. Meanwhile, Ali tries to get answers out of her dad about Charles DiLaurentis, but he insists there is no one of that name in their family; however, Jason remembers Charles as his imaginary friend when he was a kid. Later, Andrew is released from police custody because of lack of evidence, and the Liars realize that he isn't Charles after all.

After discovering a photo of Mrs. DiLaurentis with Jason and another boy, Alison and Jason found out that they had an older brother that was, in fact, Charles. Kenneth explains that Charles tried to hurt Alison when she was a kid; he was subsequently admitted to Radley for diagnosis, and he died when he was 16. The Liars then searched Radley for answers, discovering that there was another person who visited Charles in Radley: Alison's great aunt Carol. Alison, Jason, Hanna, and Spencer later discover Charles' grave in her backyard. Meanwhile, Mona later returns to Rosewood, heavily questioned by the police about her actions while her friendship with Lesli is strained because of her involvement with Mona's actions. It is later revealed that Lesli was a former patient at Radley, and was roommates with Bethany Young, leading the girls to suspect that Lesli may be 'A'. Mona, however, tells them that Lesli is only pretending to be stable and that Charles faked his own death.

When the girls found out that Charles was coming to the DiLaurentis household (for his birthday), they plan on catching him as he is set to meet with Jason. However, the plan backfires when the police appeared. Rosewood High ultimately bans the girls from their prom and graduation after an incident at Aria's photo gallery contest. Hanna discovers that the company who gave her a scholarship is affiliated with Radley (and Mr. DiLaurentis). She and Spencer decided to return the money to the company, where they meet Rhys Matthews, whom they later suspected to be Charles. The girls also became suspicious of Aria's friend Clark, believing that he may be working for Charles when they saw him following Rhys into a warehouse. Despite being banned, the girls head over to the prom when they discover that Alison was meeting Charles there. Subsequently, Charles kidnaps Alison at the prom; the girls began searching for her, along with Ezra, Toby, Caleb, Sara, Mona, and Clark (who is revealed to be an undercover agent).

Working with Mona and Sara, the girls finally infiltrate A's lair, where they discover a live feed of Alison coming face to face with Charles, who is revealed to be CeCe Drake. CeCe then begins to explain her story and motives, revealing that she was born as Charles, but was not accepted by her father for believing she was a girl. She was sent to Radley, where she eventually transitioned into Charlotte. She also explains what led to Mrs. Cavanaugh's death at the hands of Bethany Young, her complicated relationship with Bethany and her subsequent death, the events regarding the night Alison disappeared, the deal she made with Mona, the events at the burning lodge, Wilden's death, the events in New York, and their mother's death. She explained that she did everything just to be closer to her family, and she became 'A' when she thought that the Liars were happy about Alison's 'death', so she wanted to make them suffer for it but couldn't stop the game because she grew obsessed with it. CeCe also reveals that Sara is both the other Red Coat and The Black Widow, working under CeCe's orders, leaving Emily distraught. CeCe heads for the roof to commit suicide (after her bomb attempt fails and Emily subdues Sara), but Alison and the girls convince her to stop, saying they now understand why she became 'A'. CeCe then surrenders and declares the game over. On Labor Day weekend, the girls say goodbye as they are leaving for college except for Alison who stays in Rosewood.

Five years later, as the girls have each pursued their own path and have started adjusting to a life without 'A', they are once again called back to Rosewood when Alison asks for their help for her sister Charlotte to be released from the psychiatric hospital. While the girls agree to help, Aria is the only who tells the brutally honest truth: she is still scared of Charlotte and doesn't want her released. Eventually, she is, only for her to be murdered the same night and then thrown from the church's bell tower. At her funeral, the girls are stunned to see Sara show up and begin to question her sudden appearance.

Sara starts stalking Emily. It is later revealed that on the night 'A' was revealed, after Emily punched Sara, Sara tried to stand up and put her hands on an electrical block, severely injuring her hands and making it difficult for her to touch or hold things. Eventually, a new 'A' rises, sending threatening messages with creep emojis to the Liars, determined to get answers on the night Charlotte was murdered. Convinced that Sara is 'Uber A', the girls search for answers. Ali reveals that she and Charlotte's doctor, Elliott, are dating. Later they are married by Aria. The girls initially suspect Aria killed Charlotte. The suspicion shifts to Ezra and then Byron. Later, the suspicion shifts to Melissa when Spencer discovers Melissa's suitcase is broken with the missing part matching the description of the alleged murder weapon. Emily eventually finds it and is nearly run over by a truck and the driver steals the weapon. To save Ezra from losing his book deal with Aria's publishing company, she decides to write and submit some chapters for Ezra's new book. She's forced to tell him and they finish it together. 

Emily is donating eggs to pay for school and loses her eggs when the clinic encounters a minor shutdown of its freezers; Aria gets burned by a fire caused by a malfunction at Hanna's bridal shower; and Alison falls down a flight of stairs. The girls build a plan of attack, which offers Hanna as bait. After Ali sees what appears to be her dead mother and Detective Wilden, she starts to question her sanity and checks herself into the same hospital Charlotte attended. Spencer, Toby and Mona work together to catch Sara, but instead they find old medical records for a woman named Mary Drake, and she was the one who gave birth to Charles while a patient at the Radley (now a hotel managed by Ashley Marin) 25 years ago, the DiLaurentis family adopted Charles as she was unable to take care of him.

The girls' plan is leave Hanna waiting for 'Uber A' to arrive at Lost Woods Resort, while Aria and the boys are out hiding, but when Hanna goes missing they find out that 'Uber A' used a secret passage and kidnapped her. Looking over footage from cameras outside, they all are shocked to see what looks to be Mrs. D, asking themselves how this is possible. At Alison's house, "Wilden" rips off his mask revealing himself to be Elliott, and Mary Drake, who is revealed to be Jessica's twin, joins him. They succeeded in committing Alison, and with Ali hospitalized, he has her money and the house as her husband, which is their revenge for what happened to Charlotte, as he was in love with her and Mary always felt an attachment as her birth mother. She glances at a photograph of Charlotte and says it is what she would've wanted. In the last scene, we see Hanna's unconscious body being dragged by 'Uber A' in the church's bell tower.

Cast

Main cast 
 Troian Bellisario as Spencer Hastings
 Ashley Benson as Hanna Marin
 Tyler Blackburn as Caleb Rivers 
 Lucy Hale as Aria Montgomery
 Ian Harding as Ezra Fitz
 Shay Mitchell as Emily Fields 
 Janel Parrish as Mona Vanderwaal
 Sasha Pieterse as Alison DiLaurentis
 Laura Leighton as Ashley Marin

Recurring cast 
 Dre Davis as Sara Harvey
 Travis Winfrey as Lorenzo Calderon
 Keegan Allen as Toby Cavanaugh
 Jim Abele as Kenneth DiLaurentis
 Lesley Fera as Veronica Hastings
 Nia Peeples as Pam Fields
 Holly Marie Combs as Ella Montgomery
 Huw Collins as Dr. Elliott Rollins
 Drew Van Acker as Jason DiLaurentis
 Chad Lowe as Byron Montgomery
 Andrea Parker as Jessica DiLaurentis and Mary Drake
 Titus Makin, Jr. as Clark Wilkins
 Roberto Aguire as Liam Greene

Guest cast 
 Vanessa Ray as CeCe Drake / Charlotte DiLaurentis
 Roma Maffia as Lieutenant Linda Tanner
 Lulu Brud as Sabrina
 David Coussins as Jordan Hobart
 Rebecca Breeds as Nicole Gordon
 Kara Royster as Yvonne Phillips
 Torrey DeVitto as Melissa Hastings
 Brendan Robinson as Lucas Gottesman
 Nolan North as Peter Hastings
 Bryce Johnson as Darren Wilden
 Brandon Firla as Gil
 Blake Berris as Damian Hayes
 Klea Scott as Jillian Howe
 Brandon W. Jones as Andrew Campbell
 Nathaniel Buzolic as Dean Stavros
 Caleb Lane as Rhys Matthews
 Jim Titus as Officer Barry Maple
 Annabeth Gish as Dr. Anne Sullivan
 Cody Allen Christian as Mike Montgomery
 Elizabeth McLaughlin as Lesli Stone
 Skyler Day as Claire
 Karla Droege as Marion Cavanaugh
 Jessica Belkin as Bethany Young
 Melanie Moreno as Cindy
 Monica Moreno as Mindy
 Maddie Ziegler as Creepy Dancer

Episodes

Specials

Production

Development
The show was renewed for a sixth and seventh season on June 10, 2014, right before the season five premiere aired, making Pretty Little Liars ABC Family's longest running original series. The sixth and the seventh season will consist of 20 episodes each. Filming for season 6 began on March 24, 2015. It aired 10 episodes for the first half the season, which began airing on June 2, 2015. The table read for the premiere occurred on March 23, 2015, King began writing the mid-season finale, the "summer finale", which was titled "Game Over, Charles", on May 12, 2015.

Unlike previous seasons, the sixth season will not include a special holiday-themed episode between the first and second half of the season, just like the first season. Previous holiday-themed episodes have been the thirteenth episode of each previous season excluding the first. The second half of the season will feature a new intro, after using the same intro in the previous seasons, and will feature the characters after the five-year time jump.

Casting

Janel Parrish confirmed in an interview that she would be returning to the sixth season as a series regular after her character, Mona Vanderwaal, was supposedly killed in the mid-season finale of season 5.
In the fifth-season finale, it was revealed that Mona was alive and had been held prisoner in 'A's dollhouse. Rumer Willis was announced to be returning to the show as Zoe, Emily's coach when she was in Haiti building houses. Rebecca Breeds however, playing another friend of Emily from Haiti named Nicole, replaced Willis' character. It was announced on March 25, 2015, that Project Runway alum Dre Davis was cast as Kimberly Brown. However, it was revealed that Davis will instead be playing Sara Harvey, a girl who went missing the same time as Alison. It was announced on April 21, 2015, that Troian Bellisario's real life best friend Lulu Brud Zsebe would appear on the show as Sabrina, which Bellisario commented "It's a pinch me I'm dreaming scenario."

On April 24, 2015, it was announced that actor Titus Makin Jr. had joined the cast, as his audition playing Lorenzo was leaked, however on May 27, 2015, it was announced that Travis Winfrey will be the one playing Lorenzo, who will be a cop assigned to watch over Alison and also her new love interest. On May 28, 2015, Titus revealed on Twitter that he is going to play Clark Wilkins.

For the second half of the season, several castings was announced, and will appear after the five-year time jump. On June 24, 2015, it was announced that two male recurring characters will be introduced in the second half of the season. The description of the characters was a sophisticated-yet-approachable 27-year-old working in the fashion industry named Jordan, and Liam, a 24-year-old editorial assistant from Boston. It was later announced that Roberto Aguire was cast as Liam Greene, Aria's new boyfriend, and that Australian actor David Coussins will recur as Jordan, Hanna's fiancé. On July 21, 2015, it was announced that one more recurring character will be introduced, the smart and sleek Yvonne, a politician's daughter who will cause some major drama for one of the Liars. It was later announced that Kara Royster will play Yvonne Phillips, Toby's new love interest, first appearing in the fourteenth episode. It was reported by TVLine on June 23, 2015, that Blake Berris will appear in one episode in the second half of the season. Kara Royster was cast as Yvonne, a friend of the character Toby. She will play a recurring role and will appear in three episodes starting with the 14th episode.

Writing
Executive producer Oliver Goldstick revealed in an interview that the first half of the sixth season would contain 10 episodes instead of 12, like the previous seasons, and would deal almost exclusively with the mystery of Charles DiLaurentis and every unanswered "A" mystery question since the start of the show. King said that "This is our chance to finally end this great and wonderful story." In an interview I. Marlene King said that the sixth season will deal with the mystery of Charles DiLaurentis and the "A" mystery. She confirmed that a time jump to after college will be included, and will happen after the first ten episodes. King also confirmed that the sixth season will include the liars graduating from high school.

In an interview with Entertainment Online, King said that the sixth season "is about answers and closure for all of them. It is an ending to the story that we started so long ago, but it's a very fast-paced ending to the story." As a regard to the first 10 episodes of the season, executive producer Joseph Dougherty said that they "are going to be like nothing that's ever happened before on this series. It's an incredible amount of information in every episode, but if we've done the job completely right, you should be able to figure the mystery out just before you find out."

Promotion
ABC Family promoted the sixth season by creating an online contest in which fans of the show could be a part of the marketing campaign to promote the show by sending in their art for consideration. After the fifth-season finale, fans could send their art to a website, where they would be given a chance to be used in ABC Family's summer ad and campaign. More than 3,100 submissions was sent in, and the winner was picked out and was included in the cover of Seventeen on May 21, 2015. ABC Family promoted the season by calling it "Summer of Answers". For the second part of the season, ABC Family released a promotional poster on December 15, 2015, with the new-launched name for the network, "Freeform".

Leaks 
On July 18, 2015, a handful of information regarding the mid-season finale including the reveal of 'A' was allegedly leaked on Reddit. The person behind the account claimed to have been fired after being a PA at the set of Pretty Little Liars after failing a drug test, and could therefore reveal information about the show. Showrunner I. Marlene King took to Instagram,  where she posted a picture and reassured the audience that the claims were false and that the identity of 'A' had not been leaked. ABC Family responded to the leaks, stating, "All of the info on the site is false. No crew member was fired from PLL and we believe it is just a fan spreading incorrect information to rile up the fan base."

Reception 
The sixth season was met with positive reviews from critics. The season premiere was down from the previous premiere and down from the season five finale, with a 1.1 at the target 18–49 demographic and 2.38 total viewers, making it the least watched season premiere in the show's history.

Live + SD Ratings

DVD release

References 

2015 American television seasons
2016 American television seasons
Pretty Little Liars (franchise)